Brankley Pastures is a nature reserve of the Staffordshire Wildlife Trust. It is about  miles north-west of Barton-under-Needwood, in Staffordshire, England.

Description
In the enclosures of the 1800s, trees were cleared in Needwood Forest as the land was converted to agricultural use.

There is a circular walk through the reserve. The trail includes Oakwood Pasture, an ancient woodland where the original wood pasture has survived. There is a long-term project — it will take hundreds of years — to recreate this landscape in the rest of the reserve. Acorns and other tree seeds are scattered, and cattle are introduced, enough to manage the grassland but few enough to leave the new trees unaffected by browsing.

References

Nature reserves in Staffordshire
Forests and woodlands of Staffordshire
Ancient woods in England